Olivera Prokopović (26 December 1949 – 2007), also Olivera Bjelajac-Prokopović, was a Serbian chess player who held the FIDE title of Woman International Master (1979). She is a winner of the Yugoslav Women's Chess Championship (1978).

Biography
In the late 1970s and early 1980s Olivera Prokopović was one of the leading Yugoslav women's chess players. She won the Yugoslav Women's Championship in 1978 on tie-break. In 1979, she participated at the Women's World Chess Championship Interzonal Tournament in Alicante shared 13th-14th place In 1979, she was awarded the FIDE Woman International Master (WIM) title.

Olivera Prokopović played for Yugoslavia in the Women's Chess Olympiads:
 In 1978, at first reserve board in the 8th Chess Olympiad (women) in Buenos Aires (+2, =0, -1),
 In 1980, at first reserve board in the 9th Chess Olympiad (women) in Valletta (+4, =3, -1).

References

External links

1949 births
2007 deaths
Sportspeople from Leskovac
Serbian female chess players
Yugoslav female chess players
Chess Woman International Masters
Chess Olympiad competitors
20th-century chess players